Claus Hinrich Casdorff (6 August 1925 in Hamburg – 6 February 2004) was a German journalist.

Life 
Casdorff worked as journalist for German broadcaster Westdeutscher Rundfunk. Together with journalist Rudolf Rohlinger he started tv-magazine  in 1965.

Casdorff died on 6 February 2004.

Books by Casdorff 
 Kreuzfeuer. interviews von Kolle bis Kiesinger. Berlin: Lenz, 1971

Awards 
 1979: Order of Merit of the Federal Republic of Germany
 1991: Order of Merit of North Rhine-Westphalia

References 

German male journalists
German television journalists
20th-century German journalists
1925 births
2004 deaths
Journalists from Hamburg
Officers Crosses of the Order of Merit of the Federal Republic of Germany
Westdeutscher Rundfunk people